Santiago Fernández (born 28 November 1985 in Buenos Aires) is an Argentine rugby footballer currently playing for Bayonne after previously playing for another French club Montpellier and amateur side Hindu Club, although he was paid by the Argentine Rugby Union as one of their better home-based players. His preferred position is at fly-half, although he can also play at centre.
A starlet for the age group teams in Argentina as well as the sevens team Fernandez has been capped at full team level and played at the 2011 Rugby World Cup in New Zealand.

Fernández replaced Felipe Contepomi in Argentina's autumn tour in Europe.

References

External links
ESPN Scrum Profile
ARU Profile (Spanish)
Top 14 Player Profile

Argentine rugby union players
1985 births
Living people
Rugby union centres
Rugby union fly-halves
Argentina international rugby union players
Montpellier Hérault Rugby players
Aviron Bayonnais players
Pampas XV players
Rugby union players from Buenos Aires
Argentina international rugby sevens players